Sphenophryne stenodactyla is a species of frog in the family Microhylidae. The specific name stenodactyla is derived from the Greek words stenos meaning "narrow" and dactylos meaning "digit".

Description
Adult males measure  and females  in snout–vent length. The head is narrower than the plump body. The eyes are relatively small. The tympanum is barely visible. The dorsum is mottled in two shades of brown; small areas of paler ground color are occasionally showing through (coloration is highly variable between individuals and areas). Both the fingertips and toe tips are flattened but not disclike. There is no webbing between the fingers or the toes.

The male advertisement call has been variously described as "woodeny croaking", "soft chirping krrr, krrr not unlike that of a cricket", and "a single short enh, rapidly
repeated".

Habitat and conservation
Its natural habitats are alpine grassland with tree ferns. It is very common in suitable habitat. There are no known threats to this species, although it could be impacted by fires.

References

stenodactyla
Amphibians of Papua New Guinea
Endemic fauna of Papua New Guinea
Taxa named by Richard G. Zweifel
Taxonomy articles created by Polbot
Amphibians described in 2000